Sergejus Novikovas (born 5 May 1972) is a retired Lithuanian football defender.

References

1972 births
Living people
Lithuanian footballers
FK Žalgiris players
Association football defenders
Lithuania international footballers